Mantua Railway Station is the main station of Comune of Mantua in the Region of Lombardy, northern Italy.

The station, situated at Piazza Don Leone and northwest of the city centre, was opened in 1873. It is a junction of three railway lines: Verona-Modena Railway, Milan-Mantua Railway and Mantua-Monselice Railway (which connects to Padua). There was a fourth railway line, the now defunct Mincio Valley Line (to Peschiera del Garda), which terminated at Mantua until 1967.

The station is currently managed by Rete Ferroviaria Italiana (RFI). The commercial area of the passenger building, however, is managed by Centostazioni.

Train services are operated by Trenitalia and Trenord, Lombardy's regional transport agency. All of the above companies, except Trenord, are wholly owned subsidiaries of Ferrovie dello Stato (FS), Italy's state-owned rail company. FS holds 50% ownership of Trenord through Trenitalia; Trenord's other 50% shares are held by former Milan's railway agency, LeNord.

History
Despite the transfer of Lombardy to Piedmont-Sardinia (later Kingdom of Italy) in 1859, Mantua was stationed by Austrian troops who ruled Venetia (including Verona) until 1867. Construction of Verona-Mantua railway began under the Austrian Empire's Südbahn in the 1850s.

In 1853, the first section of Verona-Modena Railway was completed up to St. Antonio Mantovano station (Porto Mantovano) outside Mantua.

On 21 June 1873, the extended section crossed River Mincio.

In 1874, the entire Verona-Modena Railway was completed. Through train services connected Verona and Mantua to the Milan-Bologna Mainline at Modena.

Facilities

The passenger building has two floors. The ground level hosts a ticket office, a waiting room, a cafe-bar and the office of the traffic control department. The first floor is reserved for use by Trenitalia.

The station yard has nine through tracks and one terminating track. Among the through tracks, four are used for freight traffic and six for passenger services. There are plans to relocate the on-site goods yard to Mantova Frassine station, since the new location would be closer to the industrial zone.

Passenger and train movements
The station has 2.8 million passenger movements per year.

Introduction of a direct service to Rome (axed in 2003) has begun in September 2016. The reinstated former Eurostar-Italy high-speed service now operates with Frecciargento carriages: the fastest travel time between Mantua and Modena is 35–40 minutes (1 hour 10 minutes by regional trains).

The following services call at this station:

 High-speed train (Trenitalia Frecciargento) Rome-Mantova: Rome (Termini) - Rome (Tiburtina) - Florence - Bologna - Modena - Mantova
 Regional train (Trenitalia Regional) Verona-Mantova: Verona - Villafranca di Verona - Mantova
 Regional train (Trenitalia/TPER Regional) Mantova-Modena/Bologna: Mantova - Suzzara - Carpi - Modena - (Bologna)
 Regional train (Trenitalia Regional) Mantova-Cremona: Mantova - Bozzolo - Piadena - Cremona (stopping service)
 Regional train (Trenitalia Regional) Mantova-Monselice/Venice: Mantova - Nogara - Cerea - Monselice - (Venice (Mestre))
 Regional train (Trenord Regional Express) Mantova-Milan: Mantova - Piadena - Cremona - Codogno - Lodi - Milan (Roderego) - Milan (Lambrate) - Milan (Central)
 Regional train (Trenord Regio) Mantova-Parma: Mantova - Castellucchio - Piadena - Casalmaggiore - Parma

Defunct

The station has been the terminus of the Mincio Valley Line, which took its route along River Mincio to Lake Garda (Lago di Garda) at Peschiera del Garda. A daily bus service, operated by APAM 46, now replaces the railway.

Interchange

APAM, transport agency of Mantua, operates interurban bus routes which stop outside the railway station. Interurban buses connect Mantua with Brescia (No. 2), Peschiera del Garda (No. 46) and nearby towns such as Asola, Sabbionetta, Moglia, Mirandola and Suzzara. The railway station's interchange is also a stop of other intercity bus services, such as ATV Verona-Mantua (No. 148) and long-distance coaches to Modena and Bolzano/Bozen.

Between March 2013 and December 2014, a direct shuttle bus service ran daily between Mantova railway station and Verona-Villafranca Airport, connecting the city with its closest international gateway. This service was provided by APAM. The journey took 45 minutes. This service ceased operation on 1 January 2015.

Future

Since August 2014, new regional carriages with enhanced mobility and comfort have been introduced to Verona-Mantua-Modena services. After the World Expo 2015, Trenord has guaranteed 18 to 20 sets of double-decker regional trains on services between Milan and Mantua.

In 2015, talks with the Italian State Railway have begun in order to improve train connections to Verona and Milan. Current regional trains takes 46 minutes to complete a journey of 37 km between Mantua and Verona. New proposals could see the introduction of non-stop services, which could take only 30 minutes on the same route, during morning and evening peak hours.

Since 2015, doubling of tracks on the Milan-Cremona-Mantua Railway is underway to promote reliability and punctuality to train services.

See also

History of rail transport in Italy
List of railway stations in Lombardy
Rail transport in Italy
Railway stations in Italy

References

External links

This article is based upon a translation of the Italian language version as at January 2011.

Railway Station
Railway stations in Lombardy
Railway stations opened in 1873